is a Japanese voice actress. Notably, she performs the voices of Princess Zelda and Tetra in the video game The Legend of Zelda: The Wind Waker and had a minor role in two episodes of anime series InuYasha. She has also acted in other video games, like Tokimeki Memorial 2, Power Stone and its sequel, Street Fighter EX, Grandia, La Pucelle: Tactics, and Persona 2 and its sequel.

Tokusatsu
B-Robo Kabutack (Tentorina)
Mirai Sentai Timeranger (Jewel Thief Rouge (ep. 6))

External links

1973 births
Japanese voice actresses
Living people